James Armstrong (died 1794) was a well-to-do planter from Pitt County, North Carolina and served as an officer in the Revolutionary War.

Revolutionary War service
Armstrong's service record included the following

 1776–1781, 8th North Carolina Regiment, Captain in the New Bern District Minutemen, then Pitt County Regiment of the North Carolina militia  
 November 26, 1776, Commissioned a Colonel
 June 1, 1778, commander of 4th North Carolina Regiment 
 June 20, 1779, wounded at the Battle of Stono Ferry in South Carolina  
 January 1781, retired on half pay  
 1781, appointed Brig. Gen. (Pro Tempore) for very short while when the NC General Assembly thought (incorrectly) that BG William Caswell had resigned.

Post war years
Armstrong was active in politics after the war
 1782, Commissioner of Confiscated Property for the District of New Bern
 1784, elected by the North Carolina General Assembly of October 1784 to serve as a member of the North Carolina Council of State
 1788 to 1790, served in the North Carolina House of Commons
 November 1789, represented Pitt County at the Fayetteville North Carolina Constitutional convention
 1794, died in Pitt County, family left the area

References

Bibliography
 
 
 William L. Saunders and Walter Clark, eds., Colonial and State Records of North Carolina, 26 vols. (1886–1907)
 
 

Members of the North Carolina House of Representatives
North Carolina militiamen in the American Revolution
Continental Army officers from North Carolina
1794 deaths